Riya is an feminine given name. Notable people with the name include:

Riya, Japanese singer
Riya Bamniyal, Indian actress 
Riya Deepsi, Indian actress and model
Riya Sen (born 1981), Indian actress
Riya Suman, Indian actress

Feminine given names